Vyacheslav Pavlovich Shestakov (born 1935) is a Russian philosopher who holds the title of .

Selected publications 
 in Russian
 Европейский эрос. Философия любви и европейское искусство. [] Moscow: ЛКИ, 2020 
 
 in English
 Transformation of Eros. Philosophy of Love and European art. — Edwin Mellen Press, 1996.

References 

Soviet philosophers
Russian philosophers
1935 births
Living people